Mapiripán is a town and municipality in the Meta Department, Colombia. It was the site of the 1997 Mapiripán Massacre.

See also
Mapiripán Massacre

References

Municipalities of Meta Department